This list is of the Cultural Properties of Japan located within the town of Yuzawa in Niigata Prefecture.

Statistics
12 Properties have been designated and a further 1 Property registered.

Designated Cultural Properties

Registered Cultural Properties

See also
 Cultural Properties of Japan
 Snow Country

References

External links
 Outline of the Cultural Administration of Japan
  Cultural Properties of Niigata Prefecture
  Cultural Properties of Yuzawa

Yuzawa, Niigata
Lists of Cultural Properties of Japan